The Hanriot HD.22 was a racer aircraft built by Hanriot in the early 1920s.

Design
The HD.22 was a high-wing monoplane intended for the Coupe Deutsch de la Meurthe. It had an all-metal fuselage.

Specifications

References

HD.22
Racing aircraft